R. P. Terrell was the fourth head football coach for Eastern New Mexico University in Portales, New Mexico and he held that position for the 1938 season.  His overall coaching record at Eastern NMU was 3 wins, 5 losses, and 2 ties.  This ranks him 13th at Eastern NMU in terms of total wins and 11th at Eastern NMU in terms of winning percentage.

Terrell also coached the basketball team for the 1938–39 season.

References

Year of birth missing
Year of death missing
College men's basketball head coaches in the United States
Eastern New Mexico Greyhounds football coaches
Eastern New Mexico Greyhounds men's basketball coaches